Loxopterygium grisebachii is a species of plant in the family Anacardiaceae. It is found in Argentina and Bolivia. It is threatened by habitat loss.

References

grisebachii
Vulnerable plants
Taxonomy articles created by Polbot